Markham Bay is a bay  wide, lying between Ekelöf Point and Hamilton Point on the east side of James Ross Island, Antarctica. It was possibly first seen by a British expedition under James Clark Ross, who explored this area in 1842–43, but was first charted by the Swedish Antarctic Expedition, 1901–04, under Otto Nordenskjöld, who named it for Sir Clements Markham.

References

Bays of James Ross Island